Eugene Paul Stilp (born July 1, 1950) is the 2014 Pennsylvania 104th district House of Representatives candidate, running on the Democratic ticket. Stilp is well known for opposing the 2005 Pennsylvania General Assembly pay raise and his combined use of targeted legal action and creative media-generating props to achieve political change in Pennsylvania. He was born in Wilkes-Barre.

Political advocacy
He is a non-practicing attorney who has filed many public advocacy suits against the government of Pennsylvania. He is best known as an opponent of the 2005 Pennsylvania General Assembly pay raise controversy.

The Philadelphia Inquirer named Stilp one of the three "Citizens of the Year" in 2005.

The Pennsylvania Report named him to the 2009 "The Pennsylvania Report 100" list of influential figures in Pennsylvania politics.

Stilp designed the Flight 93 Memorial Flag.

He was praised by Ralph Nader for his use of props for political activism.

Known for ribbing former Pennsylvania governor Ed Rendell about his weight, Stilp passed out bumper stickers in Punxsutawney, Pennsylvania on February 2 during Rendell's term as governor which read, "PLEASE, GOV. RENDELL - DON'T EAT THE GROUNDHOG!"

Statue of Liberty replica
Stilp built and installed a replica of the Statue of Liberty on a pier of the late Marysville Bridge in the Dauphin Narrows of Susquehanna River north of Harrisburg. It was made of venetian blinds and stood 18 feet (5.5 m) tall. Six years later, after it was destroyed in a windstorm, it was rebuilt by Stilp and other local citizens, of wood, metal, glass and fiberglass, to a height of 25 feet (7.6 m).

2012 congressional campaign
Stilp announced in January 2012 that he would seek the Democratic nomination to challenge Republican incumbent Lou Barletta in Pennsylvania's 11th congressional district. In the April 2012 primary, Stilp won 54.6% of the vote defeating Wilkes-Barre attorney Bill Vinsko. Vinsko's campaign spending far outpaced Stilp's; Vinsko spent $102,463 to Stilp's $13,814.

On October 31, 2012, Gene Stilp was endorsed by the greater Harrisburg, PA area by the Patriot News. This article is titled "Give Gene Stilp a chance: Activist makes sense for 11th District." In the article, Gene is heralded for protesting against government excess and acting upon it. For example, after Pennsylvania lawmakers enacted a late-night pay raise in 2005, Stilp was the one who, acting alone on principles of injustice and exploitation, filed the lawsuit and won part of the state Supreme Court case against the method used to award the pay increases. While there are many examples of Gene's candor and resolve, he continues to champion higher education and job creation, a vitally important and current issue in Pennsylvania.

On November 3, 2012, right on the heels of the endorsement by the Harrisburg Patriot-News, Gene Stilp was endorsed by the Citizens' Voice, one of the largest and influential newspapers in the 11th Congressional District. The major points the article goes on to say in its endorsement for Gene as a candidate representative of the 11th Congressional District are as follows: Gene "has proven to be an effective taxpayer advocate and his positions on the issues," he "[will] protect Medicare benefits, supporting fairer taxes, implementing Obamacare", and he "[will] better reflect the interests of residents of the 11th Congressional District, which, after redistricting, now stretches from Wyoming County in the north to Cumberland County in the south."

See also
 2005 Pennsylvania General Assembly pay raise controversy

References

External links
 Gene Stilp's Facebook page

1950 births
Living people
Political activists from Pennsylvania
People from Wilkes-Barre, Pennsylvania
Pennsylvania Democrats